The 1978 1. divisjon was the 34th completed season of top division football in Norway.

Overview
It was performed in 12 teams, and IK Start won their first championship.

Teams and locations
''Note: Table lists in alphabetical order.

League table

Results

Season statistics

Top scorer
 Tom Lund, Lillestrøm – 17 goals

Attendances

References
Norway - List of final tables (RSSSF)
Norsk internasjonal fotballstatistikk (NIFS)

Eliteserien seasons
Norway
Norway
1